The Motorola Devour is an Internet and multimedia enabled smartphone designed by Motorola, which runs Google's Android operating system. In the United States, the handset is distributed exclusively  by Verizon Wireless.  The Devour has a Hearing Aid Compatibility (HAC) rating of M4/T4.  Although it runs Android, the Devour was not branded or marketed as part of Verizon's "DROID" series of Android smartphones.

MOTOBLUR 

The Devour marks the second smartphone from Motorola to feature MOTOBLUR. MOTOBLUR provides contact sync from email services like gmail and social networking sites like Twitter, Facebook etc. MOTOBLUR is a re-branded interface developed by Motorola for the Android OS. It replaces both the Google Experience skin and application stack.

MOTOBLUR's primary function is to enable the user to receive various updates from a variety of sources such as Twitter, Facebook, and Email clients directly on their phone's main screen.

See also 
List of Android devices
Droid (disambiguation)
 Galaxy Nexus

References

External links 
Motorola Devour (official site)
Motorola Devour specs (official site)
Devour from Verizon Wireless
Motorola Devour Forum

Motorola smartphones
Mobile phones with an integrated hardware keyboard
Android (operating system) devices
Verizon Wireless
Mobile phones introduced in 2010